Marco Grazzini is a Canadian film and television actor.

Background
He is a University of Toronto alumnus, having majored in Italian and Spanish with a minor in Sociology. His notable TV and movie credits include NBC's Heroes Reborn, Crackle's The Art of More and Fresh TV's Total Drama World Tour. His other passions include photography and cooking.

Filmography

References

External links

Living people
Canadian male television actors
Canadian male film actors
Canadian male models
Canadian male voice actors
Canadian people of Italian descent
Canadian male actors of Filipino descent
University of Toronto alumni
21st-century Canadian male actors
1980 births